The Thirteenth Dynasty of ancient Egypt (notated Dynasty XIII) is often combined with Dynasties XI, XII and XIV under the group title Middle Kingdom. Some writers separate it from these dynasties and join it to Dynasties XIV through XVII as part of the Second Intermediate Period. Dynasty XIII lasted from approximately 1803 BC until approximately 1649 BC, i.e. for 154 years.

According to Kim S. B. Ryholt, the 13th Dynasty was a continuation through a female line of the preceding 12th Dynasty, with its first pharaoh, Sobekhotep I, a son of queen regnant Sobekneferu and her husband Amenemhat and not a son of Amenemhat IV, as often stated. Amenemhat IV in reality died childless. Kim Ryholt proposes that the demarcation between the two dynasties reflects the rise of the independent 14th Dynasty in the eastern Delta, an event which, he proposes, occurred during Sobekneferu's reign. As  direct heirs to the kings of the 12th Dynasty, pharaohs of the 13th Dynasty reigned from Memphis over Middle and Upper Egypt, all the way to the second cataract to the south. The power of the 13th Dynasty waned progressively over its 150 years of existence and it finally came to an end with the conquest of Memphis by the Hyksos rulers of the 15th Dynasty, c. 1650 BC.

Rulers
In later texts, this dynasty is usually described as an era of chaos and disorder. However, the period may have been more peaceful than was once thought since the central government in Itj-tawy near the Faiyum was sustained during most of the dynasty and the country remained relatively stable. The period was undoubtedly characterized by decline, with a large number of kings with short reigns and only a few attestations. The true chronology of this dynasty is difficult to determine as there are few monuments dating from the period. Many of the kings' names are only known from odd fragmentary inscriptions or from scarabs.  The names and order in the table are based on Dodson and Hilton and Ryholt.

Following these kings, the remaining rulers of the 13th Dynasty are only attested by finds from Upper Egypt. This may indicate the abandonment of the old capital Itjtawy in favor of Thebes. Daphna Ben Tor believes that this event was triggered by the invasion of the eastern Delta and the Memphite region by Canaanite rulers. For some authors, this marks the end of the Middle Kingdom and the beginning of the Second Intermediate Period. This analysis is rejected by Ryholt and Baker however, who note that the stele of Seheqenre Sankhptahi, reigning toward the end of the dynasty, strongly suggests that he reigned over Memphis. The stele is of unknown provenance.

The chronological position of a number of attested rulers could not be conclusively determined due to a lack of evidence:

Sobekhotep I and II
Ryholt posits a ruler named "Sobkhotep I Sekhemre Khutawy" as the first king of this dynasty. This is now the dominant hypothesis in Egyptology and Sobekhotep Sekhemre Khutawy is referred to as Sobekhotep I in this article. Ryholt thus credits Sekhemre Khutawy Sobkhotep I with a reign of 3 to 4 years c. 1800 BC and proposes that Khaankhre Sobekhotep II reigned c. 20 years later in 1780 BC. Dodson and Hilton similarly believe that Sekhemre Khutawy Sobekhotep predated Khaankhre Sobekhotep.

Successors

After allowing discipline at the southern forts to deteriorate, the government eventually withdrew its garrisons and, not long afterward, the forts were reoccupied by the rising Nubian state of Kush. In the north, Lower Egypt was overrun by the Hyksos, a Semitic people from across the Sinai. An independent line of kings created Dynasty XIV that arose in the western Delta during later Dynasty XIII. According to Manetho, into this unstable mix came invaders from the east called the Hyksos who seized Egypt "without striking a blow; and having overpowered the rulers of the land, they then burned our cities ruthlessly, razed to the ground the temples of gods..." Their regime, called Dynasty XV, was claimed to have replaced Dynasties XIII and XIV in most of the country.

However, recent archaeological finds at Edfu could indicate that the Hyksos 15th dynasty was already in existence at least by the mid-13th dynasty reign of king Sobekhotep IV. In a recently published paper in Egypt and the Levant, Nadine Moeller, Gregory Marouard and N. Ayers discuss the discovery of an important early 12th dynasty Middle Kingdom administrative building in the eastern Tell Edfu area of Upper Egypt which was in continual use into the early Second Intermediate Period until the 17th dynasty, when its remains were sealed up by a large silo court. Fieldwork by Egyptologists in 2010 and 2011 into the remains of the former 12th dynasty building which was also used in the 13th dynasty led to the discovery of a large adjoining hall which proved to contain 41 sealings showing the cartouche of the Hyksos ruler Khyan together with 9 sealings naming the 13th dynasty king Sobekhotep IV. The preserved contexts of these seals shows that Sobekhotep IV and Khyan were most likely contemporaries of one another. This could mean that the 13th dynasty did not control all of Egypt when Sobekhotep IV acceded to power, and that there was a significant overlap between the 13th and 15th dynasties since Sobekhotep IV was only a mid-13th dynasty ruler; although one of its most powerful kings. Therefore, Manetho's statement that the Hyksos 15th dynasty violently replaced the 13th dynasty could be a piece of later Egyptian propaganda. Rather, the 13th dynasty's authority must have been collapsing throughout Egypt in its final decades and the Hyksos state in the Delta region simply took over Memphis and ended the 13th dynasty's kingdom. However, this analysis and the conclusions drawn from it are rejected by Egyptologist Robert Porter, who argues that Khyan ruled much later than Sobekhotep IV (a gap of c. 100 years exists between the two in conventional chronologies) and that the seals of a pharaoh were used long after his death.  Thus the seals of Sobekhotep IV might not indicate that he was a contemporary of Khyan.

Merneferre Ay was the last Egyptian ruler of the 13th Dynasty who is attested by objects in both Lower and Upper Egypt. Henceforth, his successors, from Merhotepre Ini on, are only attested in Upper Egypt.

References

Clayton, Peter A. Chronicle of the Pharaohs: The Reign-by-Reign Record of the Rulers and Dynasties of Ancient Egypt. London: Thames & Hudson Ltd., 2006. .

 
States and territories established in the 19th century BC
States and territories disestablished in the 17th century BC
13
19th century BC in Egypt
18th century BC in Egypt
17th century BC in Egypt
2nd-millennium BC establishments in Egypt
2nd-millennium BC disestablishments in Egypt
2nd millennium BC in Egypt

de:Zweite Zwischenzeit#13. Dynastie